Cristian Omar Espinoza (born 3 April 1995) is an Argentine professional footballer who plays as a winger for Major League Soccer club San Jose Earthquakes.

Club career

Huracán
Born in Buenos Aires, Espinoza graduated from Huracán's youth setup. He made his first team debut on 24 March 2013, coming on as a second half substitute in a 2–2 home draw against Instituto for the Primera B Nacional championship.

Espinoza scored his first professional goal on 26 May, netting his side's last in a 3–1 home win against Crucero del Norte. He subsequently established himself as a regular starter, scoring two goals in 2014 and helping his side promote to Primera División.

Espinoza made his debut in the main category of Argentine football on 3 May 2015, in a 1–1 away draw against Rosario Central. His first goals in the category came on 2 August, netting a brace in a 3–3 draw at Crucero del Norte.

Villarreal
On 4 August 2016, Espinoza signed a five-year contract with La Liga side Villarreal CF. Fifteen days later, he was loaned to fellow league team Deportivo Alavés until the end of the season.

Espinoza made his debut in the main category of Spanish football on 28 August 2016, replacing Ibai Gómez in a 0–0 home draw against Sporting de Gijón. After being rarely used, he left the club the following 30 January.

On 31 January 2017, Espinoza was loaned to Segunda División side Real Valladolid until June.

San Jose Earthquakes
On 2 January 2019, Espinoza was loaned to Major League Soccer side San Jose Earthquakes on a season-long loan.

On 11 December 2019, it was announced that Espinoza had joined San Jose on a permanent deal for a club-record transfer fee.

International career
On 11 December 2014 Espinoza was included in Argentina under-20's 32-man list for the 2015 South American Youth Football Championship, held in Uruguay. He was included in the final call-up, and made his debut in the competition on 14 January, starting and assisting Tomás Martínez in the third of a 5–2 routing over Ecuador.

References

External links

1995 births
Living people
Footballers from Buenos Aires
Argentine footballers
Association football forwards
Argentine Primera División players
Primera Nacional players
Club Atlético Huracán footballers
Boca Juniors footballers
La Liga players
Villarreal CF players
Deportivo Alavés players
Segunda División players
Real Valladolid players
San Jose Earthquakes players
Argentina youth international footballers
Argentina under-20 international footballers
2015 South American Youth Football Championship players
Argentine expatriate footballers
Argentine expatriate sportspeople in Spain
Expatriate footballers in Spain
Footballers at the 2016 Summer Olympics
Olympic footballers of Argentina
Major League Soccer players
Designated Players (MLS)